The World Group was the highest level of Davis Cup competition in 1984.

Australia were the defending champions, but were eliminated in the semifinals.

Sweden won the title, defeating the United States in the final, 4–1. The final was held at the Scandinavium in Gothenburg, Sweden, from 16 to 18 December. It was the Swedish team's first Davis Cup title since 1975 and their 2nd Davis Cup title overall.

Participating teams

Draw

First round

Australia vs. Yugoslavia

Great Britain vs. Italy

West Germany vs. Argentina

Romania vs. United States

Czechoslovakia vs. Denmark

India vs. France

New Zealand vs. Paraguay

Sweden vs. Ecuador

Quarterfinals

Australia vs. Italy

United States vs. Argentina

Czechoslovakia vs. France

Sweden vs. Paraguay

Semifinals

United States vs. Australia

Sweden vs. Czechoslovakia

Final

Sweden vs. United States

Relegation play-offs
The first-round losers played in the Relegation Play-offs. The winners of the play-offs advanced to the 1985 Davis Cup World Group, and the losers were relegated to their respective Zonal Regions.

Results summary
Date: 28–30 September

Great Britain vs. Yugoslavia

West Germany vs. Romania

Denmark vs. India

Ecuador vs. New Zealand

References

External links
Davis Cup official website

World Group
Davis Cup World Group
Davis Cup